William Michael Crose (February 8, 1867 – April 4, 1929) was a United States Navy Captain and the seventh Naval Governor of American Samoa, from November 10, 1910 to March 14, 1913. He was the first person designated "Governor of American Samoa", rather than the previous "Governor of Tutuila".

Life and career

Early life
Crose was born in Greencastle, Indiana on February 8, 1867. He was appointed to the United States Naval Academy on May 19, 1884 and graduated in 1888.

Naval career
The United States Department of the Navy awarded Crose the Navy Cross for "exceptionally meritorious service in a duty of great responsibility as Commanding Officer of the U.S.S. NORTH DAKOTA in the Atlantic Fleet, during World War I." On July 1, 1890, Crose was commissioned into the United States Navy as an ensign. On May 10, 1898, he became a lieutenant (junior grade), and a lieutenant on March 3, 1898.

Governorship
On November 10, 1910, Crose relieved Captain John Frederick Parker of command of United States Naval Station Tutuila, becoming the seventh Naval Governor of American Samoa. While Governor, Crose appointed a board of education, composed of a naval chaplain, a naval assistant surgeon, and the wife of a local school teacher. He also pushed for the renaming of the island Naval Post, claiming the name Tutuila was inadequate, as the territory contained additional islands other than Tutuila, and recommending a new name of either "American Samoa" or "Eastern Samoa", a wish he expressed to the Secretary of the Navy in a 1911 letter. On July 17, 1911, the island was officially designated "American Samoa", and President of the United States William Howard Taft recommissioned Crose as "Governor of American Samoa", rather than "Governor of Tutuila" on October 24, 1912.

Crose also amended laws on firearms, perjury, road maintenance, and importation of animals. On March 14, 1913, Crose transferred command to Nathan Woodworth Post.

Post-governorship
Crose died in San Diego on April 4, 1929, and was buried at sea.

Notes

References

1867 births
1929 deaths
Governors of American Samoa
People from Greencastle, Indiana
American military personnel of World War I
Recipients of the Navy Cross (United States)
United States Naval Academy alumni
United States Navy officers
Military personnel from Indiana
Burials at sea